Albert Guðmundsson (born 30 April 1958) is an Icelandic former footballer who played as a midfielder. He won seven caps for the Iceland national football team between 1977 and 1980. During his playing career, Albert had spells in Iceland, Canada and Sweden.

References
 

1958 births
Living people
Albert Gudmundsson
Albert Gudmundsson
Association football midfielders
Ängelholms FF players
Albert Gudmundsson
North American Soccer League (1968–1984) players
North American Soccer League (1968–1984) indoor players
Edmonton Drillers (1979–1982) players
Helsingborgs IF players
Mjällby AIF players
Landskrona BoIS players
IFK Malmö Fotboll players
Albert Gudmundsson
Albert Gudmundsson
Albert Gudmundsson
Expatriate soccer players in Canada
Expatriate footballers in Sweden
Albert Gudmundsson
Albert Gudmundsson